On Through the Night is the debut studio album by the English rock band Def Leppard, released on 14 March 1980. The album was produced by Tom Allom. It charted at No. 15 on the UK Albums Chart and No. 51 on the Billboard 200. The album features re-recorded versions of "Rocks Off" and "Overture", tracks from the band's original independently released EP, The Def Leppard E.P.. Other tracks are re-recorded versions of early demos, some of which later appeared on the 2020 box set The Early Years 79–81. The album was certified gold by the RIAA on 18 November 1983 and platinum on 9 May 1989.

"Wasted", "Hello America" and "Rock Brigade" were released as singles. However, the version of "Wasted" that appears on the single is a different recording from that of the LP, as is its B-side, "Hello America".

The spoken word intro to "When the Walls Came Tumbling Down" was performed by Dave Cousins of Strawbs. Joe Elliott had done the spoken portion in earlier live performances and demo recordings that showed up on some early bootlegs. In his biography, Cousins claims that he did his best Laurence Olivier impersonation for the song's intro.

Reception

The album received mostly positive reviews. 
AllMusic's Steve Huey noted that On Through the Night "established the band as one of the leading lights of the New Wave of British Heavy Metal." Although he stated that "it may lack the detailed production and more pop-oriented songwriting of later efforts, (...) some Leppard fans prefer this sound." Canadian journalist Martin Popoff praised the album for being "one of the most polished and savvy of the NWOBHM", evoking the sound of "acts like Thin Lizzy, UFO, even Queen and Mott the Hoople." For him, On Through the Night was "a welcome breath of fresh air" among the dark, "thrashy" and "punky" music coming from the UK at the time. Rolling Stones David Fricke reviewed the album favourably on the same wavelength, explaining that it "shows they not only respect their elders, they've taken cues from their New Wave peers, too." He also stated that "guitarists Pete Willis and Steve Clark shoot from the hip, packing their licks into tight, three-minute pop arrangements", and that lead singer Joe Elliott "wails wonderfully in a resonating tenor, fortified by backup harmonies and Tom Allom's battering-ram production." He concluded that the band "displays a wisdom beyond their years" in mixing melody and heaviness, coming up with an album that "is awfully impressive for a band making its vinyl debut." Sputnikmusic staff review noted that the "middle-class common-man image" of the "New Wave of British Heavy Metal" movement "partially played a part in making Def Leppard one of [its] leaders". He also stated that the band's ambition "would never allow [them] to be tunnel-visioned", but he concluded that On Through the Night "can be categorized as a grower of an album since the more superficial elements that would appeal to the mainstream will initially distract some listeners from what is actually an incredibly tight musical and vocal performance." 

Record World said that the single "Rock Brigade" has "inventive guitar leads and pulsating dance rhythms."

Most of the songs on the album were dropped from the band's live setlists after 1983, although "Rock Brigade" and "Wasted" would see periodic revivals after 2000. Also, the non-album track from the same era entitled "Good Morning Freedom" would be played live in 2013 during the opening to the "Viva Hysteria" shows.

Track listing

Personnel
Def Leppard
Joe Elliott – lead vocals, backing vocals
Steve Clark – lead and rhythm guitars, backing vocals
Pete Willis – lead and rhythm guitars, backing vocals
Rick Savage – bass guitar, backing vocals
Rick Allen – drums, backing vocals

Additional musicians
Chris M. Hughes – synthesiser on "Hello America"
Dave Cousins – voice on "When the Walls Came Tumblin' Down"

Production
(Colonel) Tom Allom – producer
Louis "Snook" Austin – engineer
Dick Plant – engineer
Alan Schmidt – artwork

Charts
 

Album

SinglesWastedHello America'

Certifications

References

Def Leppard albums
1980 debut albums
Albums produced by Tom Allom
Vertigo Records albums
Mercury Records albums
New Wave of British Heavy Metal albums